The 1918 United States Senate election in Minnesota took place on November 5, 1918. It was the first election for Minnesota's Class 2 seat in the United States Senate, and the second U.S. Senate election in Minnesota overall, held after the ratification of the Seventeenth Amendment to the United States Constitution, which established the popular election of United States Senators. Incumbent U.S. Senator Knute Nelson of the Republican Party of Minnesota easily defeated his challenger in the general election, Willis Greenleaf Calderwood of the National Party, to win a fourth term in the Senate.

Republican primary

Candidates

Declared
 Knute Nelson, Incumbent U.S. Senator since 1895
 James A. Peterson, Minneapolis attorney, former Hennepin County Attorney (1897-1899), former State Representative from the 42nd district (1901-1903), Republican candidate for U.S. Senate in 1912

Results

General election

Candidates

 Willis G. Calderwood, state chair of the Prohibition Party, Prohibition nominee for state House District 30 in 1894, for state House District 39 in 1904, 1906, 1908, and 1910, for the at-large U.S. House seat in 1912, for Governor in 1914, and for the U.S. Senate  in 1916; Farmer-Labor candidate for Lieutenant Governor in 1924

Results

See also 
 United States Senate elections, 1918

References

1918
Minnesota
United States Senate